Armadillo repeat-containing X-linked protein 3 is a protein that in humans is encoded by the ARMCX3 gene.

This gene encodes a member of the ALEX family of proteins which may play a role in tumor suppression. The encoded protein contains a potential N-terminal transmembrane domain and a single Armadillo repeat. Other proteins containing the arm repeat are involved in development, maintenance of tissue integrity, and tumorigenesis. This gene is closely localized with other family members on the X chromosome. Three transcript variants encoding the same protein have been identified for this gene.

References

External links

Further reading

Armadillo-repeat-containing proteins